Castagnola is an Italian surname. Notable people with the name include:

 Bartolomé Castagnola (1970), Argentine polo player 
 Gabriele Castagnola, (1828 – 1883), Italian artist 
 Giuliano Castagnola, (1572 – 1620), Italian Catholic
 Lou Castagnola  (1936), American long-distance runner
 Luigi Castagnola (1953), Italian former water polo player
 Luigi Castagnola (politician) (1936), Italian politician

See also 

 Castagnola (disambiguation)